Heap Big Chief is a 1919 American short comedy film featuring Harold Lloyd. Previously thought to be a lost film, a print was located at the Cinema Museum in London in 2018. The recovered film was later shown to audiences on the second day of the Silent Laughter Weekend on April 28, 2019.

Cast
 Harold Lloyd 
 Snub Pollard 
 Bebe Daniels  
 Sammy Brooks
 Lige Conley
 Lew Harvey
 Wallace Howe
 Bud Jamison
 Dee Lampton
 Earl Mohan
 Marie Mosquini
 Fred C. Newmeyer
 James Parrott
 Noah Young

See also
 Harold Lloyd filmography

References

External links

1919 films
1919 comedy films
1919 short films
1910s rediscovered films
Silent American comedy films
American black-and-white films
American silent short films
Collections of museums in the United Kingdom
American comedy short films
Films directed by Alfred J. Goulding
Films with screenplays by H. M. Walker
Rediscovered American films
1910s American films